Juan García Díaz, commonly known as Juanín (22 May 1940 – 26 March 2013), was a Spanish professional footballer who played as a forward.

Football career
Born in Nerva, Province of Huelva, Juanín played professionally for Córdoba CF and CD Calvo Sotelo, having previously represented Real Betis B and CF Extremadura in a senior career which lasted 14 years.

With Córdoba he spent one full decade, competing eight seasons in La Liga and appearing in nearly 300 official games. He scored the Andalusia club's first-ever goal in the top division, against Real Valladolid on 16 September 1962 (1–0 home win), and was part of the squad that reached the semifinals of the Copa del Rey in 1967.

Later life and death / Personal
After retiring, Juanín continued working with Córdoba the club and the city: in the former capacity he acted as assistant coach and, in the latter, he opened its first football school in 1985.

Juanín died on 26 March 2013 at the age of 72, after a brain tumor. His older brother, Ramón, was also a footballer, who played three top level games with Sevilla FC.

References

External links
 

1940 births
2013 deaths
Sportspeople from the Province of Huelva
Spanish footballers
Footballers from Andalusia
Association football forwards
La Liga players
Segunda División players
Real Betis players
CF Extremadura footballers
Córdoba CF players
CD Puertollano footballers